Pont-en-Royans is a commune in the Isère department in southeastern France.

Geography
The town is located near the Isère valley at the gates of the Vercors Regional Natural Park. It lies at the meeting of the rivers Bourne (which rises in Lans-en-Vercors) and its tributary the Vernaison (which originates in the territory of Saint-Agnan-en-Vercors). The two rivers together collect most of the waters of the Vercors. The left bank and the river after its confluence are located in the department of Drôme.

Population

Twin towns
Pont-en-Royans has been twinned with Bassiano, Italy, since 1985.

Sights
Today, Pont-en-Royans is a village displaying the medieval architecture of the sixteenth century and is famous for its colourful hanging houses. Its original architecture is due to an ingenious adaptation to the environment of the village to promote its trading activity with timber.

The water museum aims to explore the water in all its forms. A bar allows water tasting of more than 900 bottled waters of the world.
The Choranche caves lead through an underground river of stalactites. Unique amphibians (the proteas) are survivors from the time of dinosaurs.
Circus choranche and cascading Gournier.
Route des Gorges de la Bourne between Pont-en-Royans and Villard-de-Lans. Corbelled road carved into the rock and classified three stars in the Michelin guide. Work is being undertaken since 2008 to secure the route to the source of many accidents

See also
Communes of the Isère department
Parc naturel régional du Vercors

References

Communes of Isère
Isère communes articles needing translation from French Wikipedia